Rimantas Astrauskas (born 16 March 1955 in Panevėžys, Lithuania) is a physicist, ecologist, and signatory of the 1990 Act of the Re-Establishment of the State of Lithuania.

References

1955 births
Living people
Lithuanian politicians
Astrauskas
Signatories of the Act of the Re-Establishment of the State of Lithuania